Potpolje (Cyrillic: Потпоље) is a village in the municipality of Čitluk, Bosnia and Herzegovina.In 1991, village had a population of 736

Demographics 
According to the 2013 census, its population was 965.

References

Populated places in Čitluk, Bosnia and Herzegovina